Forty Forty (also known as 123 Home, Forty Forty In, Mob Mob and other names) is a children's game combining elements of the games "It" and Hide and seek. One player is "on", or "It", and they must capture the other players by 'spying' them rather than by tagging.

Rules
A player is chosen as "It" and a landmark such as a tree or lamppost is chosen as the base. Players who are not "It" run and hide, while "It" counts to a certain number depending on the version of the game; usually 40, 44 or 100. "It" looks for the other players, while the players try to get to base without being seen.

If a player gets to base without being seen, they shout "forty forty I'm free", "forty forty home", "forty forty save myself" or "forty forty in" and are then safe, waiting at base for the remainder of the game. In order to catch someone, "It" must see the person, run back, touch the base and say "forty forty I see [name]". If the "seen" player is behind or in an object, it must be specified; e.g. "forty forty I see [name] behind that tree" while pointing at it.

Players that are caught by the "It" return to base. The last person to be caught by the end of the game is "It" for the next game. Some variants make the first person caught "It" for the next game.

There are variants to allow players to be freed. In some variants, a player reaching base can say "Release, one, two, three" or a similar chant to release one or all captured players. If the last player reaches the base without being spied, they can chant a variant of 'Forty-forty, one, two, three, all saved', and all the players are freed to play again.

Ping Pong
In one variant, the initial "It" is selected by a system known as Ping Pong. All those playing stand in a circle, holding out arms so that their index fingers touch whilst a designated selector says either "Ping", (zero, once or repeatedly as they see fit) or "Pong".  Once the designated selector says "Pong", everyone breaks formation hurriedly as the first person that the designated selector can touch becomes "It".  If the designated selector is unable to touch someone by lunging or by sleight of hand to the right or the left, the designated selector is free to pursue one or more of the fleeing circle that has just broken formation.  However, if someone wrongfully breaks prematurely, i.e. before "Pong" is said, then the forfeit is that they are "It".

Other names
The game is known by many names, including Mob, 44 home, Ackey 123, Block 123, Relievo 123, Hicky 123, Rally 123, Pom Pom and I-Erkey

References

External links

Children's games
Tag variants
Hide-and-seek variants

pl:Zabawa w chowanego